The  is an outdoor marble monument in the city of Seville, Andalusia, Spain. It is installed along María Luisa Park. It was inaugurated on 12 October 1929—the Día de la Hispanidad (Columbus Day). It has written part of the 1905 poem "Salutación del optimista", written by Nicaraguan poet Rubén Darío (1867–1916).

History and construction

The Monumento a la Raza was conceived by the organisers of the Ibero-American Exposition of 1929. On top, he planned a viewing platform and restaurants that could be accessed by lifts.

The final project was designed by Santiago Martínez, and it was inaugurated on 12 October 1929—the Día de la Hispanidad (Columbus Day). It is located in Isabel la Católica Avenue, in María Luisa Park, near the north tower of the Seville's Plaza de España.

The monument was restored by the Urban Planning Management Agency of Seville in mid-2018.

Description
The monument is made of marble.

Poem

The monument has inscripted in bronze the poem "Salutación del optimista" (1905) by Nicaraguan poet Rubén Darío (1867–1916), a salutation to Hispanic Americans.

References

External links 

 

1929 establishments in Spain
Buildings and structures in Seville
Monuments and memorials in Andalusia
Tourist attractions in Seville